Gioacchino Guaragna (14 June 1908 – 19 April 1971) was an Italian fencer. He won two gold medals and a silver in the team foil event at three different Olympic games.

References

1908 births
1971 deaths
Italian male fencers
Olympic fencers of Italy
Fencers at the 1928 Summer Olympics
Fencers at the 1932 Summer Olympics
Fencers at the 1936 Summer Olympics
Olympic gold medalists for Italy
Olympic silver medalists for Italy
Fencers from Milan
Olympic medalists in fencing
Medalists at the 1928 Summer Olympics
Medalists at the 1932 Summer Olympics
Medalists at the 1936 Summer Olympics